Duane Rousselle (born April 28, 1982) is a Canadian sociological theorist, Lacanian psychoanalyst, and Professor of Sociology. He works in several academic fields including Social Movement Studies, Lacanian Psychoanalysis, Cultural Sociology, Gender and Sexuality Studies, Anarchist Studies, and Continental Philosophy. His work attempts to introduce an alternative to scholarly discourses that aim to produce consistent and coherent bodies of knowledge (e.g., "University Discourse"). It also offers a counterpoint to what Jacques Lacan has called "capitalist discourse."

He helped to contribute to the emergence of a new field of scholarly investigation known as "post-anarchism." He founded and edits the journal Anarchist Developments in Cultural Studies. He is a noted Canadian public intellectual.

Biography 
Duane was born in Miramichi, New Brunswick to Catholic parents. He attended the New Brunswick Community College and graduated with a diploma in Electronic Game Design. After participating in a hunger strike for admittance, he was accepted as a Sociology Major at the University of New Brunswick in Fredericton. During this first year of his university education, he experienced devastating poverty, sleeping on park benches. He received numerous prestigious awards, including the Lieutenant Governor of New Brunswick silver medal for excellence in scholarship.

He went on to complete a master's degree in sociology from the University of New Brunswick before joining the PhD program in Cultural Studies from Trent University. During his time in Peterborough, he became a Freemason. He was awarded the Governor General of Canada Gold Medal for his research into clinical psychoanalysis and continental philosophy.

He studied also at the European Graduate School in Saas-Fee, Switzerland, working as an assistant for Slavoj Zizek and Alain Badiou.

In 2016, Duane raised more than $100,000 to help rebuild a mosque that was attacked in a hate crime in Peterborough, Ontario. His efforts received international attention and he was invited for a private meeting with the Prime Minister Justin Trudeau. This was the subject of a documentary film by Matthew Hayes, The Masjid. Duane received several death threats at this time and went into hiding.

Duane converted to Islam in order to marry his partner. This relationship was documented by Colin Boyd Shafer in his documentary photo exhibit Interlove Project.

In 2019, Duane moved to Mumbai. In 2020, he returned to Canada and accepted an appointment to teach at the Department of Sociology and Anthropology at Nipissing University. In 2021, he became engaged to the "negative psychoanalyst" Julie Reshe. Duane Rousselle was Professor of Sociology and Psychoanalysis at the School of Advanced Studies, University of Tyumen until the outbreak of the Russia-Ukrainian conflict. After this time, he fled to Kazakhstan and then arrived in Ireland with his fiancée. Their engagement was ended while in Ireland.Duane is a Visiting Associate Professor of Sociology at the University College of Dublin. He is also an Assistant Professor at one of the Indian Institutes of Technology.

His work has been translated into multiple languages, including Russian, Arabic, and Spanish.

Key Ideas

particular affirmations

One of Duane's key theories is that there has been a rise in the logic of 'particular affirmations' of enjoyment after what Slavoj Zizek and others referred to as the decline of symbolic efficiency. These 'particular affirmations' are capable of producing the same results as modern fascism without any need of prohibitions against particular segments of the population. This logic has developed out of close readings of the late teachings of Jacques Lacan and the seminars of Jacques-Alain Miller. His argument was central to a debate with the noted philosopher Slavoj Zizek.

Neo-Slovenian School

One of his major projects has been to perform a torsion of the work of the Ljubljana school of psychoanalysis, resituating their theories into another register In several published debates between himself and Slavoj Zizek he has advanced critiques of their theories of ideology, constitutive lack, surplus jouissance, totality, and capitalism to arrive at a distinctively anarchist psychoanalytic theory of contemporary politics.

Outside Dreams

Duane has argued that the dream is a meta-verse and that today we dream outside of ourselves. He argues that there are today the perpetuation of false negativities, which are actually fawnings/faux-negs of jouissance or enjoyment. The argument is that our satisfactions are perpetuated through naive notions of cynicism, negativity, criticality, and so on.

False Negatives

In recent work, Duane has argued that theories of the death drive within Freudo-Marxism have led to misleading characterizations of the concept of negativity. He has claimed that the concept of negativity actually demonstrates positive fixations of jouissance. He has claimed that much of radical leftist continental philosophy today promotes “false negatives” and “false twists.”

Plat-farm Capitalism

His work focuses on what he terms “feudal fixations” which remain present within so-called contemporary capitalism. His claim is that we are today in a sort of “plat-farm” capitalism, which is really capitalism in a feudal mode. This has led to a controversial statement that “capitalism would be an advancement.”

Awards

Works 
 Post-Anarchism: A Reader (Pluto Books) 
 After Post-Anarchism (Repartee Books/LBC)
 Lacanian Realism: Political and Clinical Psychoanalysis (Bloomsbury Books) 
 Jacques Lacan and American Sociology: Be Wary of the Image (Palgrave) 
 Gender, Sexuality, and Subjectivity: A Lacanian Perspective on Identity, Language and Queer Theory (Routledge)
 Real Love: Essays on Psychoanalysis, Religion, and Society (Atropos)
 Post-anarchism and Psychoanalysis: Seminars on Politics and Society (Real Books)

References 

Canadian psychoanalysts
Canadian sociologists
Canadian anarchists
1982 births
Living people